The Jean-Noël River is a tributary of the north shore of the Saint Lawrence River, in the administrative region of Capitale-Nationale, in the province of Quebec, in Canada. This river flows through the regional county municipalities (MRC) of:
 Charlevoix Regional County Municipality: in the municipalities of Saint-Hilarion and Les Éboulements;
 Charlevoix-Est Regional County Municipality: in the municipality of Saint-Irénée.

The southern part of this small valley is accessible by rue Principale de Saint-Irénée and chemin du rang Saint-Pierre, which pass on the east side. The intermediate part is served by the rang Saint-Pierre road which first passes north of the river; then on the south side going west. The upper part is served by a forest road which passes on the north side of the river. Forestry and agriculture are the main economic activities in this valley; recreational tourism, second.

The surface of the Jean-Noël River is generally frozen from the beginning of December until the end of March; however, safe traffic on the ice is generally from mid-December to mid-March. The water level of the river varies with the seasons and the precipitation; the spring flood occurs in March or April.

Geography 
The Jean-Noël river takes its source from a small lake located on the north side of Chemin de Saint-Hilarion, in an agricultural area. This small lake is located at:
  south of the village center of Saint-Hilarion;
  north-west of Baie des Éboulements on the north-west bank of the St. Lawrence River;
  north of downtown Baie-Saint-Paul;
  south-west of the mouth of the Jean-Noël river.

  towards the east by forming a large loop towards the south-east, until the discharge (coming from the north-west) of an unidentified lake;
  towards the east by forming a curve towards the south and collecting a stream (coming from the northwest), up to a stream (coming from the southeast) whose l 'mouth is located on the north side of Chemin Saint-Nicolas;
  to the north, forming small streamers, until the confluence of the rivière du Premier Rang (coming from the southwest);
  towards the northeast, winding heavily at the start of the segment, collecting a stream (coming from the southeast), up to the outlet (coming from the northwest) d 'a set of small lakes;
  towards the north-east by forming two loops towards the south, by collecting the outlet (coming from the south) of Lac de la Tourelle, by cutting the path of the 1st range, by collecting a stream (coming from the northwest) forming a loop towards the south along the chemin du rang Saint-Nicolas, to another stream (coming from the northwest);
  towards the north-east, crossing almost continuously crossing rapids, until the confluence of the rivière Jean-Noël Nord-Est (coming from the north-west);
  eastward in a deep valley, crossing several series of rapids, crossing the route 362 and cutting the railway which runs along the shore of the St. Lawrence River, to its mouth.

The Jean-Noël river flows on the northwest shore of the Estuary of Saint Lawrence, in the heart of the village of Saint-Irénée. This mouth is located at:
  south of downtown La Malbaie;
  north-east of downtown Baie-Saint-Paul;
  north-east of the center of the village of Saint-Hilarion.

Toponymy 
This toponym evokes the first name of one of the pioneers of Saint-Irénée.

The toponym "Rivière Jean-Noël" was formalized on December 5, 1968 at the Place Names Bank of the Commission de toponymie du Québec.

Notes and references

Appendices

Related articles 
 Charlevoix Regional County Municipality
 Charlevoix-Est Regional County Municipality
 Saint-Hilarion, a municipality
 Les Éboulements, a municipality
 Saint-Irénée, a municipality
 Rivière Jean-Noël Nord-Est
 Rivière du Premier Rang
 St. Lawrence River
 List of rivers of Quebec

External links 

Rivers of Capitale-Nationale
Charlevoix Regional County Municipality
Charlevoix-Est Regional County Municipality